Morphia of Melitene, or Morfia, or Moraphia (died c. 1126 or 1127) was queen of the crusader Kingdom of Jerusalem as the wife of Baldwin II.

Marriage 
Morphia was the daughter of an Armenian nobleman named Gabriel (or Khoril, in Armenian), the ruler of the city of Melitene. Although ethnically Armenian, the family practised the Greek Orthodox faith. Melitene was a neighbour of the crusader County of Edessa, and Gabriel soon became a vassal of the county. Baldwin of Rethel became Count of Edessa after 1100, and he consolidated his position in the county by marrying Morphia around 1101. Gabriel, who was very wealthy, gave 50,000 gold bezants as a dowry. The diplomatic marriage fortified alliances in the region.  

Baldwin and Morphia had four daughters: Melisende (who married Fulk V, Count of Anjou), Alice (who married Bohemond II, Prince of Antioch), Hodierna (who married Raymond II, Count of Tripoli) and Ioveta.

Queenship 

Baldwin was elected King of Jerusalem as successor of Baldwin I in 1118, but Morphia and their daughters remained in Edessa. 

By the time of his election as king, Baldwin II and Morphia already had three daughters. As the new king, Baldwin II had been encouraged to put away Morphia in favor of a new younger wife with better political connections- one that could yet bear him a male heir. Armenian historian Matthew of Edessa wrote that Baldwin II was thoroughly devoted to his wife, and refused to consider divorcing her. As a mark of his love for his wife, Baldwin II had postponed his coronation until Christmas Day 1119 so that Morphia and their daughters could travel to Jerusalem, and so that Morphia could be crowned alongside him. 

For her part, Queen Morphia did not interfere in the day to day politics of Jerusalem, but demonstrated her ability to take charge of affairs when events warranted it. When Baldwin was captured during a campaign in 1123, Morphia hired a band of Armenian mercenaries to discover where her husband was being held prisoner. In 1124 Morphia took a leading part in the negotiations with Baldwin's captors to have him released, including traveling to Syria and handing over their youngest daughter Ioveta as hostage and as surety for the payment of the King's ransom.

Death and legacy 

According to the Melisende Psalter, Queen Morphia died on 1 October, but the year is unknown; it was either 1126 or 1127, more likely 1126. With no male heir, Baldwin II designated Melisende, their oldest daughter, as his heir, and married her to Fulk V of Anjou. Two of their other daughters also married influential crusader lords: Alice married Bohemund II of Antioch, and Hodierna married Raymond II of Tripoli. Ioveta became a nun.

Queen Morphia was probably partially responsible for the Greek and Armenian cultural influences that appeared in the Latin kingdom. Art from the kingdom, such as the Melisende Psalter, often shows a mixture of eastern and western styles, just as the western crusaders had begun to accustom themselves to eastern culture. Morphia was buried at the Abbey of St. Mary of the Valley of Jehoshaphat, just outside Jerusalem.

Notes

References
 Jackson-Laufer, Guida Myrl, Women Rulers throughout the Ages: An illustrated guide, ABC-CLIO, 1999.
 Tyerman, Christopher, God's War, Harvard University Press, 2008.

|-
 

 

1120s deaths
Queens consort of Jerusalem
People from Malatya
12th-century Armenian people
Year of birth unknown
Year of death uncertain